The Hokkien variety of Chinese is a Southern Min language native to and originating from the Minnan region, where it is widely spoken in the south-eastern part of Fujian in southeastern mainland China. In Chinese linguistics, these languages are known by their classification under the Quanzhang division of Min Nan, which comes from the first characters of the two main Hokkien urban centers of Quanzhou and Zhangzhou.

Hokkien is one of the national languages in Taiwan, and it is also widely spoken within the Chinese diaspora in Singapore, Indonesia, Malaysia, the Philippines and other parts of Southeast Asia; and by other overseas Chinese beyond Asia and all over the world. The Hokkien 'dialects' are not all mutually intelligible, but they are held together by ethnolinguistic identity. Taiwanese Hokkien is, however, mutually intelligible with the 2 to 3 million speakers in Xiamen and Singapore.

In Southeast Asia, Hokkien historically served as the lingua franca amongst overseas Chinese communities of all dialects and subgroups, and it remains today as the most spoken variety of Chinese in the region, including in Singapore, Malaysia, Indonesia, Philippines and some parts of Indochina (particularly Thailand, Vietnam, Laos and Cambodia). The Betawi Malay language, spoken by some five million people in and around the Indonesian capital Jakarta, includes numerous Hokkien loanwords due to the significant influence of the Chinese Indonesian diaspora, most of whom are of Hokkien ancestry and origin.

Names
Chinese speakers of the Quanzhang variety of Southern Min refer to the mainstream Southern Min language as

  (literally 'language or speech of Southern Min') in China and Taiwan.
  (literally 'our people's speech') in the Philippines.
Hok-kiàn-ōe / Hok-kiàn-ōa (福建話, literally 'Hokkien speech') in Malaysia, Singapore, Indonesia and Brunei.

In parts of Southeast Asia and in the English-speaking communities, the term Hokkien is etymologically derived from the Southern Min pronunciation for Fujian, the province from which the language hails. In Southeast Asia and the English press, Hokkien is used in common parlance to refer to the Southern Min dialects of southern Fujian, and does not include reference to dialects of other Sinitic branches also present in Fujian such as the Fuzhou language (Eastern Min), Pu-Xian Min, Northern Min, Gan Chinese or Hakka. 

The word Hokkien first originated from Walter Henry Medhurst when he published the Dictionary of the Hok-këèn Dialect of the Chinese Language, According to the Reading and Colloquial Idioms in 1832. This is considered to be the earliest English-based Hokkien Dictionary and the first major reference work in POJ, although the romanization within was quite different from the modern system. In this dictionary, the word "Hok-këèn" was used. In 1869, POJ was further revised by John Macgowan in his published book A Manual Of The Amoy Colloquial. In this book, "këèn" was changed to "kien" as "Hok-kien" and from then on, the word "Hokkien" began to be used more often. 

Historically, Hokkien was also known as "Amoy", after the Hokkien name of Xiamen, the principal port of Southern Fujian during the Qing dynasty as one of the five ports opened to foreign trade by the Treaty of Nanking. By 1873, Rev. Carstairs Douglas would publish his dictionary named "Chinese–English Dictionary of the Vernacular or Spoken Language of Amoy, With the Principal Variations of the Chang-chew and Chin-chew Dialects." where he would call the language as "The Language of Amoy" or "The Amoy Vernacular" and by 1883, Rev. John Macgowan would publish another dictionary named "English and Chinese Dictionary of the Amoy Dialect". Due to confusion with differentiating the Amoy dialect of Hokkien from Xiamen with the general language itself, many proscribe this usage though many old books and media may still be observed to be labeled with "Amoy" instead to generally refer to the language, besides the specific dialect of Hokkien from Xiamen.

Geographic distribution
Hokkien is spoken in the southern, seaward quarter of Fujian province, southeastern Zhejiang, and eastern Namoa Island in China; Taiwan; Metro Manila, Metro Cebu, Metro Davao and other cities in the Philippines; Singapore; Brunei; Medan, Riau and other cities in Indonesia; and from Taiping to the Thai border in Malaysia, especially around Penang.

Hokkien originated in the southern area of Fujian province, an important center for trade and migration, and has since become one of the most common Chinese varieties overseas. The major pole of Hokkien varieties outside of Fujian is nearby Taiwan, where immigrants from Fujian arrived as workers during the 40 years of Dutch rule, fleeing the Qing dynasty during the 20 years of Ming loyalist rule, as immigrants during the 200 years of Qing dynasty rule, especially in the last 120 years after immigration restrictions were relaxed, and even as immigrants during the period of Japanese rule. The Taiwanese dialect mostly has origins with the Tung'an, Quanzhou and Zhangzhou variants, but since then, the Amoy dialect, also known as the Xiamen dialect, has become the modern prestige representative for the language in China. Both Amoy and Xiamen come from the Chinese name of the city; the former is from Zhangzhou Hokkien, whereas the latter comes from Mandarin.

There are many Minnan (Hokkien) speakers among overseas Chinese in Southeast Asia as well as in the United States (Hoklo Americans). Many ethnic Han Chinese emigrants to the region were Hoklo from southern Fujian, and brought the language to what is now Burma (Myanmar), Vietnam, Indonesia (the former Dutch East Indies) and present day Malaysia and Singapore (formerly Malaya and the British Straits Settlements). Most of the Minnan dialects of this region have incorporated some foreign loanwords. Hokkien is reportedly the native language of up to 80% of the ethnic Chinese people in the Philippines, among which is known locally as Lán-nâng-uē ("Our people's speech"). Hokkien speakers form the largest group of overseas Chinese in Singapore, Malaysia, Indonesia and Philippines.

Classification

Southern Fujian is home to four principal Minnan Proper (Hokkien) dialects: Chiangchew, Chinchew, Tung'an, and Amoy, originating from the cities of Quanzhou, Zhangzhou, historical Tung'an County (同安縣, now Xiamen and Kinmen) and her own Port of Amoy, respectively.

The Quanzhou dialect spoken in Quanzhou was the Traditional Representative Minnan. The Quanzhou dialect is considered to be the most conservative Minnan dialect.

In the late 1800s, the Amoy dialect attracted special attention, because Amoy was one of the five ports opened to foreign trade by the Treaty of Nanking, but before that it had not attracted attention. The Amoy dialect is adopted as the Modern Representative Minnan. The Amoy dialect can not simply be interpreted as a mixture of the Zhangzhou and Quanzhou dialects, but rather it is formed on the foundation of the Tung'an dialect with further inputs from other sub-dialects. It has played an influential role in history, especially in the relations of Western nations with China, and was one of the most frequently learnt dialect of the Hokkien variety by Westerners during the second half of the 19th century and the early 20th century.

The Modern Representative form of Hokkien spoken around the city of Tainan (台南) in Taiwan heavily resembles the Tung'an dialect. All Hokkien dialects spoken throughout the whole of Taiwan are collectively known as Taiwanese Hokkien, or Holo locally, although there is a tendency to call these Taiwanese language for historical reasons. It is spoken by more Taiwanese than any Sinitic language except Mandarin, and it is known by a majority of the population; thus, from a socio-political perspective, it forms a significant pole of language usage due to the popularity of Holo-language media. Douglas (1873/1899) also noted that Formosa (Taiwan) has been settled mainly by emigrants from Amoy (Xiamen), Chang-chew (Zhangzhou), and Chin-chew (Quanzhou). Several parts of the island are usually found to be specially inhabited by descendants of such emigrants, but in Taiwan, the various forms of the dialects mentioned prior are a good deal mixed up.

Southeast Asia
The varieties of Hokkien in Southeast Asia originate from these dialects. Douglas (1873/1899) notes that "Singapore and the various Straits Settlements , Batavia  and other parts of the Dutch possessions , are crowded with emigrants, especially from the Chang-chew  prefecture; Manila and other parts of the Philippines have great numbers from Chin-chew , and emigrants are largely scattered in like manner in Siam , Burmah , the Malay Peninsula , Cochin China , Saigon , &c. In many of these places there is also a great mixture of emigrants from Swatow ."

In modern times though, a mixed dialect descended from the Quanzhou, Amoy, and Zhangzhou dialects, leaning a little closer to the Quanzhou dialect, possibly due to being from the Tung'an dialect, is spoken by Chinese Singaporeans, Southern Malaysian Chinese, and Chinese Indonesians in Indonesia's Riau province and Riau Islands. Variants include Southern Peninsular Malaysian Hokkien and Singaporean Hokkien in Singapore.

Among Malaysian Chinese of Penang, and other states in Northern Peninsular Malaysia and ethnic Chinese Indonesians in Medan, with other areas in North Sumatra, Indonesia, a distinct descendant dialect form of Zhangzhou Hokkien has developed. In Penang, it is called Penang Hokkien while across the Malacca Strait in Medan, an almost identical variant is known as Medan Hokkien.

As for Chinese Filipinos in the Philippines, a variant known as Philippine Hokkien, which is also mostly derived from Quanzhou Hokkien, particularly the Jinjiang and Nan'an dialects with a bit of influence from the Amoy (Xiamen) dialect, is still spoken amongst families as most also profess ancestors from the aforementioned areas.

There are also Hokkien speakers scattered throughout other parts of Indonesia (such as Jakarta and around the island of Java), Thailand (especially Southern Thailand on the border with Malaysia), Myanmar, other parts of Malaysia (such as Eastern (Insular) Malaysia), Brunei, Cambodia, and Southern Vietnam (such as in Saigon / Ho Chi Minh City), though there are notably more of Teochew/Swatow background among descendants of Chinese migrants in regions such as parts of Peninsular Malaysia, Thailand, Cambodia, Laos, and Southern Vietnam.

History

Variants of Hokkien dialects can be traced to three sources of origin: Tong'an, Quanzhou and Zhangzhou. Both Amoy Hokkien and most of Taiwanese Hokkien is heavily based on the Tong'an dialect, and to a lesser extent, on Quanzhou and Zhangzhou dialects, while the rest of the Hokkien dialects spoken in South East Asia are derived their respective homelands in southern Fujian.

Southern Fujian
During the Three Kingdoms period of ancient China, there was constant warfare occurring in the Central Plain of China. Northerners began to enter into Fujian region, causing the region to incorporate parts of northern Chinese dialects. However, the massive migration of northern Han Chinese into Fujian region mainly occurred after the Disaster of Yongjia. The Jìn court fled from the north to the south, causing large numbers of northern Han Chinese to move into Fujian region. They brought the Old Chinese spoken in the Central Plain of China from the prehistoric era to the 3rd century into Fujian.

In 677 (during the reign of Emperor Gaozong of Tang), Chen Zheng, together with his son Chen Yuanguang, led a military expedition to suppress a rebellion of the She people. In 885, (during the reign of Emperor Xizong of Tang), the two brothers Wang Chao and Wang Shenzhi, led a military expedition force to suppress the Huang Chao rebellion. Waves of migration from the north in this era brought the language of Middle Chinese into the Fujian region.

Xiamen (Amoy)
The Amoy dialect is the main dialect spoken in area of Port of Xiamen, that is, southwest corner of Xiamen island in the Chinese city of Xiamen (formerly romanized and natively pronounced as "Amoy"). Historically, Port of Xiamen had always been part of Tung'an country until after 1912 of Republic of China era. Amoy dialect cannot simply be interpreted as a mixture of Zhangzhou and Quanzhou dialects, but rather it is formed on the foundation of Tung'an dialect with further inputs from other sub-dialects, namely from the adjacent Zhangzhou dialect.

Early sources
Several playscripts survive from the late 16th century, written in a mixture of Quanzhou and Chaozhou dialects. The most important is the Romance of the Litchi Mirror, with extant manuscripts dating from 1566 and 1581.

In the early 17th century, Spanish missionaries in the Philippines produced materials documenting the Hokkien varieties spoken by the Chinese trading community who had settled there in the late 16th century:
 Doctrina Christiana en letra y lengua china (1593), a Hokkien translation of the Doctrina Christiana.
 Diccionarium Sino-Hispanicum (1604), a Spanish–Hokkien dictionary, giving equivalent words, but not definitions.
 Bocabulario de la lengua sangleya (c. 1617), a Spanish–Hokkien dictionary, with definitions.
 Arte de la Lengua Chiõ Chiu (1620), a grammar written by a Spanish missionary in the Philippines.
These texts appear to record a Zhangzhou dialect, from the old port of Yuegang (modern-day Haicheng, an old port that is now part of Longhai).

Chinese scholars produced rhyme dictionaries describing Hokkien varieties at the beginning of the 19th century:
 Lūi-im Biāu-ngō͘ (Huìyīn Miàowù) (彙音妙悟 "Understanding of the collected sounds") was written around 1800 by Huang Qian (黃謙), and describes the Quanzhou dialect. The oldest extant edition dates from 1831.
 Lūi-chi̍p Ngé-sio̍k-thong Si̍p-ngó͘-im (Huìjí Yǎsútōng Shíwǔyīn) (彙集雅俗通十五音 "Compilation of the fifteen elegant and vulgar sounds") by Xie Xiulan (謝秀嵐) describes the Zhangzhou dialect. The oldest extant edition dates from 1818.
Walter Henry Medhurst based his 1832 dictionary on the latter work.

Phonology
Hokkien has one of the most diverse phoneme inventories among Chinese varieties, with more consonants than Standard Mandarin and Cantonese. Vowels are more-or-less similar to that of Mandarin. Hokkien varieties retain many pronunciations that are no longer found in other Chinese varieties. These include the retention of the  initial, which is now  (Pinyin 'zh') in Mandarin (e.g. 'bamboo' 竹 is tik, but zhú in Mandarin), having disappeared before the 6th century in other Chinese varieties. Along with other Min languages, which are not directly descended from Middle Chinese, Hokkien is of considerable interest to historical linguists for reconstructing Old Chinese.

Initials 
Southern Min has aspirated, unaspirated as well as voiced consonant initials. For example, the word khui ("open") and kuiⁿ ("close") have the same vowel but differ only by aspiration of the initial and nasality of the vowel. In addition, Southern Min has labial initial consonants such as m in m̄-sī ("is not").

Another example is ta-po͘-kiáⁿ ("boy") and cha-bó͘-kiáⁿ ("girl"), which differ in the second syllable in consonant voicing and in tone.

 All consonants but  may be nasalized; voiced oral stops may be nasalized into voiced nasal stops. 
 Nasal stops mostly occur word-initially.
 Quanzhou and nearby may pronounce ⟨j⟩/⟨dz⟩ as ⟨l⟩ or ⟨g⟩.
 ⟨l⟩ is often interchanged with ⟨n⟩ and ⟨j⟩/⟨dz⟩ throughout different dialects.
 ⟨j⟩, sometimes into ⟨dz⟩, is often pronounced very thick so as to change to ⟨l⟩, or very nearly so.
 Some dialects may pronounce ⟨l⟩ as ⟨d⟩, or a sound very like it.
Approximant sounds [] [], only occur word-medially, and are also realized as laryngealized [] [], within a few medial and terminal environments.

Finals
Unlike Mandarin, Hokkien retains all the final consonants corresponding to those of Middle Chinese. While Mandarin only preserves the n and ŋ finals, Southern Min also preserves the m, p, t and k finals and has developed the ʔ (glottal stop).

The vowels of Hokkien are listed below:

(*)Only certain dialects
 Oral vowel sounds are realized as nasal sounds when preceding a nasal consonant.

Dialectal Sound Shifts
The following table illustrates some of the more commonly seen vowel shifts between various dialects. Further example character that features the same vowel shift is shown in parenthesis.

Tones
According to the traditional Chinese system, Hokkien dialects have 7 or 8 distinct tones, including two entering tones which end in plosive consonants. The entering tones can be analysed as allophones, giving 5 or 6 phonemic tones. In addition, many dialects have an additional phonemic tone ("tone 9" according to the traditional reckoning), used only in special or foreign loan words. This means that Hokkien dialects have between 5 and 7 phonemic tones.

Tone sandhi is extensive. There are minor variations between the Quanzhou and Zhangzhou tone systems. Taiwanese tones follow the patterns of Amoy or Quanzhou, depending on the area of Taiwan.

Dialects
The Hokkien language (Minnan) is spoken in a variety of accents and dialects across the Minnan region. The Hokkien spoken in most areas of the three counties of southern Zhangzhou have merged the coda finals -n and -ng into -ng. The initial consonant j (dz and dʑ) is not present in most dialects of Hokkien spoken in Quanzhou, having been merged into the d or l initials.

The -ik or -ɪk final consonant that is preserved in the native Hokkien dialects of Zhangzhou and Xiamen is also preserved in the Nan'an dialect (色, 德, 竹) but are pronounced as -iak in Quanzhou Hokkien.

Quanzhou Hokkien dialects (泉州閩南片):
Anxi dialect (安溪話)
Dehua dialect (德化話)
Hui'an dialect (惠安話)
Jinjiang dialect (晋江話)
Nan'an dialect (南安話)
Quanzhou dialect (泉州話)
Yongchun dialect (永春話)
Youxi dialect (尤溪話)
Philippine Hokkien (咱人話/咱儂話/菲律賓福建話)
Zhangzhou Hokkien dialects (漳州閩南片):
Longxi dialect (龍溪話)
Longyan dialect (龍巖話)
Pinghe dialect (平和話)
Yunxiao dialect (雲霄話)
Zhangpu dialect (漳浦話)
Zhangzhou dialect (漳州話)
Zhao'an dialect (詔安話)
Haifeng dialect (海豐話)
Lufeng dialect (陸豐話)
Penang Hokkien (檳城/庇能福建話)
Medan Hokkien (棉蘭福建話)
Tong'an dialect (同安話)
Tong'an (同安)
Kinmen (金門話)
Southern Peninsular Malaysian Hokkien (南馬福建話)
Singaporean Hokkien (新加坡福建話))
Amoy dialect (廈門話)
Taiwanese Hokkien (臺灣話/臺灣閩南語/台語)

Comparison
The Amoy dialect (Xiamen) is a variant of the Tung'an dialect. Majority of Taiwanese, from Tainan, to Taichung, to Taipei, is also heavily based on Tung'an dialect while incorporating some vowels of Zhangzhou dialect, whereas Southern Peninsular Malaysian Hokkien, including Singaporean Hokkien, is based on the Tung'an dialect, with Philippine Hokkien on the Quanzhou dialect, and Penang Hokkien on Zhangzhou dialect. There are some variations in pronunciation and vocabulary between Quanzhou and Zhangzhou dialects. The grammar is generally the same.

Additionally, extensive contact with the Japanese language has left a legacy of Japanese loanwords in Taiwanese Hokkien. On the other hand, the variants spoken in Singapore and Malaysia have a substantial number of loanwords from Malay and to a lesser extent, from English and other Chinese varieties, such as the closely related Teochew and some Cantonese. Meanwhile, in the Philippines, there are also a few Spanish and Filipino (Tagalog) loanwords, while it is also currently a norm to frequently codeswitch with English, Filipino (Tagalog), and in some cases other Philippine languages, such as Cebuano.

Mutual intelligibility
Tong'an, Xiamen, Taiwanese, Singaporean dialects as a group are more mutually intelligible, but it is less so amongst the forementioned group, Quanzhou dialect, and Zhangzhou dialect.

Although the Min Nan varieties of Teochew and Amoy are 84% phonetically similar including the pronunciations of un-used Chinese characters as well as same characters used for different meanings, and 34% lexically similar,, Teochew has only 51% intelligibility with the Tong'an Hokkien|Tung'an dialect (Cheng 1997) whereas Mandarin and Amoy Min Nan are 62% phonetically similar and 15% lexically similar. In comparison, German and English are 60% lexically similar.

Hainanese, which is sometimes considered Southern Min, has almost no mutual intelligibility with any form of Hokkien.

Grammar
Hokkien is an analytic language; in a sentence, the arrangement of words is important to its meaning. A basic sentence follows the subject–verb–object pattern (i.e. a subject is followed by a verb then by an object), though this order is often violated because Hokkien dialects are topic-prominent. Unlike synthetic languages, seldom do words indicate time, gender and plural by inflection. Instead, these concepts are expressed through adverbs, aspect markers, and grammatical particles, or are deduced from the context. Different particles are added to a sentence to further specify its status or intonation.

A verb itself indicates no grammatical tense. The time can be explicitly shown with time-indicating adverbs. Certain exceptions exist, however, according to the pragmatic interpretation of a verb's meaning. Additionally, an optional aspect particle can be appended to a verb to indicate the state of an action. Appending interrogative or exclamative particles to a sentence turns a statement into a question or shows the attitudes of the speaker.

Hokkien dialects preserve certain grammatical reflexes and patterns reminiscent of the broad stage of Archaic Chinese. This includes the serialization of verb phrases (direct linkage of verbs and verb phrases) and the infrequency of nominalization, both similar to Archaic Chinese grammar.

Choice of grammatical function words also varies significantly among the Hokkien dialects. For instance, khit (乞) (denoting the causative, passive or dative) is retained in Jinjiang (also unique to the Jinjiang dialect is thō͘ 度) and in Jieyang, but not in Longxi and Xiamen, whose dialects use hō͘ (互/予) instead.

Pronouns
Hokkien dialects differ in the pronunciation of some pronouns (such as the second person pronoun lí or lú or lír), and also differ in how to form plural pronouns (such as -n or -lâng). Personal pronouns found in the Hokkien dialects are listed below:

1 Exclusive
2 Inclusive
3 儂 (-lâng) is typically suffixed in Southeast Asian Hokkien dialects (with the exception of Philippine Hokkien)

Possessive pronouns can be marked by the particle ê (的), in the same way as normal nouns. In some dialects, possessive pronouns can also be formed with a nasal suffix, which means that possessive pronouns and plural pronouns are homophones:

The most common reflexive pronoun is ka-kī (家己). In formal contexts, chū-kí (自己) is also used.

Hokkien dialects use a variety of demonstrative pronouns, which include:
this – che (這, 即), chit-ê (即個)
that – he (許, 彼), hit-ê (彼個)
here – chia (遮), chit-tau (即兜)
there – hia (遐), hit-tau (彼兜)

The interrogative pronouns include:
what – siáⁿ-mih (啥物), sím-mih (甚麼), há-mi̍h (何物)
when – tī-sî (底時), kúi-sî (幾時), tang-sî (當時), sím-mih sî-chūn (甚麼時陣)
where – tó-lo̍h (倒落), tó-uī (倒位)
who – siáⁿ-lâng (啥人), siáng (誰), 
why – ūi-siáⁿ-mih (為啥物), ūi-sím-mih (為甚物), án-chóaⁿ (按怎), khah (盍)
how – án-chóaⁿ (按怎), lû-hô (如何), cháiⁿ-iūⁿ (怎樣)

Copula ("to be") 
States and qualities are generally expressed using stative verbs that do not require the verb "to be":

With noun complements, the verb sī (是) serves as the verb "to be".

To indicate location, the words tī (佇) tiàm (踮), leh (咧), which are collectively known as the locatives or sometimes coverbs in Chinese linguistics, are used to express "(to be) at":

Negation
Hokkien dialects have a variety of negation particles that are prefixed or affixed to the verbs they modify. There are six primary negation particles in Hokkien dialects (with some variation in how they are written in characters):
m̄ (毋, 呣, 唔, 伓)
bē (未)
bōe
mài (莫, 【勿愛】)
bô (無)
put (不) – literary

Other negative particles include:
bâng (甭)
bián (免)
thài (汰)

The particle m̄ (毋, 呣, 唔, 伓) is general and can negate almost any verb:

The particle mài (莫, 【勿爱】), a concatenation of m-ài (毋愛) is used to negate imperative commands:

The particle bô (無) indicates the past tense:

The verb 'to have', ū (有) is replaced by bô (無) when negated (not 無有):

The particle put (不) is used infrequently, mostly found in literary compounds and phrases:

Vocabulary 
The majority of Hokkien vocabulary is monosyllabic. Many Hokkien words have cognates in other Chinese varieties. That said, there are also many indigenous words that are unique to Hokkien and are potentially not of Sino-Tibetan origin, while others are shared by all the Min dialects (e.g. 'congee' is 糜 mê, bôe, bê, not 粥 zhōu, as in other dialects).

As compared to Mandarin, Hokkien dialects prefer to use the monosyllabic form of words, without suffixes. For instance, the Mandarin noun suffix 子 (zi) is not found in Hokkien words, while another noun suffix, 仔 (á) is used in many nouns. Examples are below:
'duck' – 鴨 ah or 鴨仔 ah-á (SC: 鴨子 yāzi)
'color' – 色 sek (SC: 顏色 yán sè)

In other bisyllabic morphemes, the syllables are inverted, as compared to Mandarin. Examples include the following:
'guest' – 人客 lâng-kheh (SC: 客人 kèrén)

In other cases, the same word can have different meanings in Hokkien and Mandarin. Similarly, depending on the region Hokkien is spoken in, loanwords from local languages (Malay, Tagalog, Burmese, among others), as well as other Chinese dialects (such as Southern Chinese dialects like Cantonese and Teochew), are commonly integrated into the vocabulary of Hokkien dialects.

Literary and colloquial readings 

The existence of literary and colloquial readings is a prominent feature of some Hokkien dialects and indeed in many Sinitic varieties in the south. The bulk of literary readings (bûn-tha̍k), based on pronunciations of the vernacular during the Tang dynasty, are mainly used in formal phrases and written language (e.g. philosophical concepts, given names, and some place names), while the colloquial (or vernacular) ones (pe̍h-tha̍k) are usually used in spoken language, vulgar phrases and surnames. Literary readings are more similar to the pronunciations of the Tang standard of Middle Chinese than their colloquial equivalents. 

The pronounced divergence between literary and colloquial pronunciations found in Hokkien dialects is attributed to the presence of several strata in the Min lexicon. The earliest, colloquial stratum is traced to the Han dynasty (206 BCE – 220 CE); the second colloquial one comes from the period of the Northern and Southern dynasties (420–589 CE); the third stratum of pronunciations (typically literary ones) comes from the Tang dynasty (618–907 CE) and is based on the prestige dialect of Chang'an (modern day Xi'an), its capital.

Some commonly seen sound correspondences (colloquial → literary) are as follows:
p- → h
ch-, chh- → s
k-, kh- → ch
-ⁿ → n
-h → t
i → e
e → a 
ia → i

This table displays some widely used characters in Hokkien that have both literary and colloquial readings:

This feature extends to Chinese numerals, which have both literary and colloquial readings. Literary readings are typically used when the numerals are read out loud (e.g. phone numbers, years), while colloquial readings are used for counting items.

Semantic differences between Hokkien and Mandarin 
Quite a few words from the variety of Old Chinese spoken in the state of Wu, where the ancestral language of Min and Wu dialect families originated, and later words from Middle Chinese as well, have retained the original meanings in Hokkien, while many of their counterparts in Mandarin Chinese have either fallen out of daily use, have been substituted with other words (some of which are borrowed from other languages while others are new developments), or have developed newer meanings. The same may be said of Hokkien as well, since some lexical meaning evolved in step with Mandarin while others are wholly innovative developments.

This table shows some Hokkien dialect words from Classical Chinese, as contrasted to the written Mandarin:

For other words, the classical Chinese meanings of certain words, which are retained in Hokkien dialects, have evolved or deviated significantly in other Chinese dialects. The following table shows some words that are both used in both Hokkien dialects and Mandarin Chinese, while the meanings in Mandarin Chinese have been modified:

Words from Minyue 
Some commonly used words, shared by all Min Chinese languages, came from the ancient Minyue languages. Jerry Norman suggested that these languages were Austroasiatic. Some terms are thought be cognates with words in Tai Kadai and Austronesian languages. They include the following examples, compared to the Fuzhou dialect, a Min Dong language:

Loanwords 
Loanwords are not unusual among Hokkien dialects, as speakers readily adopted indigenous terms of the languages they came in contact with. As a result, there is a plethora of loanwords that are not mutually comprehensible among Hokkien dialects.

Taiwanese Hokkien, as a result of linguistic contact with Japanese and Formosan languages, contains many loanwords from these languages. Many words have also been formed as calques from Mandarin, and speakers will often directly use Mandarin vocabulary through codeswitching. Among these include the following examples:
'toilet' – piān-só͘ from Japanese 
Other Hokkien variants:  (sái-ha̍k),  (chhek-só͘)
'car' – chū-tōng-chhia from Japanese 
Other Hokkien variants:  (hong-chhia),  (khì-chhia)
'to admire' – kám-sim from Japanese 
Other Hokkien variants:  (kám-tōng)
'fruit' – chúi-ké / chúi-kóe / chúi-kér from Mandarin
Other Hokkien variants:  (ké-chí / kóe-chí / kér-chí)

Singaporean Hokkien, Penang Hokkien and other Malaysian Hokkien dialects tend to draw loanwords from Malay, English as well as other Chinese dialects, primarily Teochew. Examples include:
'but' – ta-pi, from Malay
Other Hokkien variants: 但是 (tān-sī)
'doctor' – 老君 ló-kun, from Malay dukun
Other Hokkien variants: 醫生(i-seng)
'stone/rock' – bà-tû, from Malay batu
Other Hokkien variants: 石头(chio̍h-thâu)
'market' – 巴剎 pa-sat, from Malay	pasar from Persian bazaar (بازار)
Other Hokkien variants: 市場 (chhī-tiûⁿ), 菜市 (chhài-chhī)
'they' – 伊儂 i-lâng from Teochew (i1 nang5)
Other Hokkien variants: 𪜶 (in)
'together' – 做瓠 chò-bú from Teochew 做瓠 (jo3 bu5)
Other Hokkien variants: 做夥 (chò-hóe), 同齊 (tâng-chê) or 鬥陣 (tàu-tīn)
'soap' – 雪文 sap-bûn from Malay sabun from Arabic ṣābūn.

Philippine Hokkien, as a result of centuries-old contact with both Philippine languages and Spanish also incorporate words from these languages. Speakers today will also often directly use English and Filipino (Tagalog), or other Philippine languages like Bisaya, vocabulary through codeswitching. Examples include:
'cup' – ba-sù, from either Filipino (Tagalog) baso or Spanish vaso
Other Hokkien variants: 杯仔 (poe-á), 杯 (poe)
'office' – o-pi-sín, from either Filipino (Tagalog) opisina or Spanish oficina
Other Hokkien variants: 辦公室 (pān-kong-sek/pān-kong-siak)
'soap' – sap-bûn, from either Filipino (Tagalog) sabon or Early Modern Spanish xabon
'to pay' – pá-lâ, from Spanish paga
Other Hokkien variants: 予錢 (hō͘-chîⁿ), 還錢 (hêng-chîⁿ)
'coffee' – ka-pé, from either Filipino (Tagalog) kape or Spanish café
Other Hokkien variants: 咖啡 (ko-pi), 咖啡 (ka-pi)

Comparison with Mandarin and Sino-Xenic pronunciations

Cultural center

Quanzhou was historically the cultural center for Hokkien, as various traditional Hokkien cultural customs such as Nanguan music, Beiguan music, glove puppetry, and the Kaoka (高甲戲) and Lewan (梨園戲) genres of Hokkien opera originated from Quanzhou. This was mainly due to the fact that Quanzhou had become an important trading and commercial port since the Tang dynasty and had prospered into an important city. After the Opium War in 1842, Xiamen (Amoy) became one of the major treaty ports to be opened for trade with the outside world. From the mid-19th century onwards, Xiamen slowly developed to become the political and economical center of the Hokkien-speaking region in China. This caused the Amoy dialect to gradually replace the position of dialects from Quanzhou and Zhangzhou. From the mid-19th century until the end of World War II,  western diplomats usually learned Amoy as the preferred dialect if they were to communicate with the Hokkien-speaking populace in China or Southeast Asia. In the 1940s and 1950s, Taiwan also tended to incline towards Amoy dialect.

The retreat of the Republic of China to Taiwan in 1949 drove party leaders to seek to both culturally and politically assimilate the islanders. As a result, laws were passed throughout the 1950s to suppress Hokkien and other languages in favor of Mandarin. By 1956, speaking Hokkien in ROC schools or military bases was illegal. However, popular outcry from both older islander communities and more recent Mainlander immigrants prompted a general wave of education reform, during which these and other education restrictions were lifted. The general goal of assimilation remained, with Amoy Hokkien seen as less ‘native’ and therefore preferred.

However, from the 1980s onwards, the development of Taiwanese Min Nan pop music and media industry in Taiwan caused the Hokkien cultural hub to shift from Xiamen to Taiwan. The flourishing Taiwanese Min Nan entertainment and media industry from Taiwan in the 1990s and early 21st century led Taiwan to emerge as the new significant cultural hub for Hokkien.

In the 1990s, marked by the liberalization of language development and mother tongue movement in Taiwan, Taiwanese Hokkien had undergone a fast pace in its development. In 1993, Taiwan became the first region in the world to implement the teaching of Taiwanese Hokkien in Taiwanese schools. In 2001, the local Taiwanese language program was further extended to all schools in Taiwan, and Taiwanese Hokkien became one of the compulsory local Taiwanese languages to be learned in schools. The mother tongue movement in Taiwan even influenced Xiamen (Amoy) to the point that in 2010, Xiamen also began to implement the teaching of Hokkien dialect in its schools. In 2007, the Ministry of Education in Taiwan also completed the standardization of Chinese characters used for writing Hokkien and developed Tai-lo as the standard Hokkien pronunciation and romanization guide. A number of universities in Taiwan also offer Taiwanese degree courses for training Hokkien-fluent talents to work for the Hokkien media industry and education. Taiwan also has its own Hokkien literary and cultural circles whereby Hokkien poets and writers compose poetry or literature in Hokkien.

Thus, by the 21st century, Taiwan had become one of the most significant Hokkien cultural hubs of the world. The historical changes and development in Taiwan had led Taiwanese Hokkien to become the most influential pole of the Hokkien dialect after the mid-20th century. Today, the Taiwanese prestige dialect (Taiyu Youshiqiang/Tongxinqiang ) is heard on Taiwanese media.

Writing systems

Chinese script
Hokkien dialects are typically written using Chinese characters (Hàn-jī). However, the written script was and remains adapted to the literary form, which is based on classical Chinese, not the vernacular and spoken form. Furthermore, the character inventory used for Mandarin (standard written Chinese) does not correspond to Hokkien words, and there are a large number of informal characters (thè-jī or thòe-jī; 'substitute characters') which are unique to Hokkien (as is the case with Cantonese). For instance, about 20 to 25% of Taiwanese morphemes lack an appropriate or standard Chinese character.

While most Hokkien morphemes have standard designated characters, they are not always etymological or phono-semantic. Similar-sounding, similar-meaning or rare characters are commonly borrowed or substituted to represent a particular morpheme. In other cases, characters are invented to represent a particular morpheme (a common example is the character  in, which represents the personal pronoun "they"). In addition, some characters have multiple and unrelated pronunciations, adapted to represent Hokkien words. For example, the Hokkien word bah ("meat") has been reduced to the character , which has etymologically unrelated colloquial and literary readings (he̍k and jio̍k, respectively).

Moreover, unlike Cantonese, Hokkien does not have a universally accepted standardized character set. Thus, there is some variation in the characters used to express certain words and characters can be ambiguous in meaning. In 2007, the Ministry of Education of the Republic of China formulated and released a standard character set to overcome these difficulties. These standard Chinese characters for writing Taiwanese Hokkien are now taught in schools in Taiwan.

Latin script
Hokkien, especially Taiwanese Hokkien, is sometimes written in the Latin script using one of several alphabets. Of these the most popular is POJ, developed first by Presbyterian missionaries in China and later by the indigenous Presbyterian Church in Taiwan. Use of this script and orthography has been actively promoted since the late 19th century. The use of a mixed script of Han characters and Latin letters is also seen, though remains uncommon. Other Latin-based alphabets also exist.

Min Nan texts, all Hokkien, can be dated back to the 16th century. One example is the Doctrina Christiana en letra y lengua china, presumably written around 1593 by the Spanish Dominican friars in the Philippines. Another is a Ming dynasty script of a play called Tale of the Lychee Mirror (1566), supposedly the earliest Southern Min colloquial text, although it is written in Teochew dialect.

Taiwan has developed a Latin alphabet for Taiwanese Hokkien, derived from POJ, known as Tai-lo. Since 2006, it has been officially promoted by Taiwan's Ministry of Education and taught in Taiwanese schools. Xiamen University has also developed an alphabet based on Pinyin called Bbánlám pìngyīm.

Computing

Hokkien is registered as "Southern Min" per RFC 3066 as zh-min-nan.

When writing Hokkien in Chinese characters, some writers create 'new' characters when they consider it impossible to use directly or borrow existing ones; this corresponds to similar practices in character usage in Cantonese, Vietnamese chữ nôm, Korean hanja and Japanese kanji. Some of these are not encoded in Unicode (or the corresponding ISO/IEC 10646: Universal Character Set), thus creating problems in computer processing.

All Latin characters required by Pe̍h-ōe-jī can be represented using Unicode (or the corresponding ISO/IEC 10646: Universal Character Set), using precomposed or combining (diacritics) characters. Prior to June 2004, the vowel akin to but more open than o, written with a dot above right, was not encoded. The usual workaround was to use the (stand-alone; spacing) character Interpunct (U+00B7, ·) or less commonly the combining character dot above (U+0307). As these are far from ideal, since 1997 proposals have been submitted to the ISO/IEC working group in charge of ISO/IEC 10646—namely, ISO/IEC JTC1/SC2/WG2—to encode a new combining character dot above right. This is now officially assigned to U+0358 (see documents N1593, N2507, N2628,
N2699, and N2713).

Cultural and political role

Hokkien (or Min Nan) can trace its roots through the Tang dynasty and also even further to the people of the Minyue, the indigenous non-Han people of modern-day Fujian. Min Nan (Hokkien) people call themselves "Tang people," which is synonymous to "Chinese people". Because of the widespread influence of the Tang culture during the great Tang dynasty, there are today still many Min Nan pronunciations of words shared by the Vietnamese, Korean and Japanese languages.

In 2002, the Taiwan Solidarity Union, a party with about 10% of the Legislative Yuan seats at the time, suggested making Taiwanese a second official language. This proposal encountered strong opposition not only from Mainlander groups but also from Hakka and Taiwanese aboriginal groups who felt that it would slight their home languages. Because of these objections, support for this measure was lukewarm among moderate Taiwan independence supporters, and the proposal did not pass.

Hokkien was finally made an official language of Taiwan in 2018 by the ruling DPP government.

See also

Hokkien Kelantan
Hokkien people
Languages of China
Languages of Taiwan
List of Hokkien dictionaries
List of Hokkien people
Amoy Min Nan Swadesh list

References

Further reading

 
 
 
 
 
  An analysis and facsimile of the Arte de la Lengua Chio-chiu (1620), the oldest extant grammar of Hokkien.

External links

  A playscript from the late 16th century.
  Hokkien translation of the Doctrina Christiana:
 at Biblioteca Nacional de España
 at UST Miguel de Benavidez Library, Manila
 at NCTU, Taiwan
 at Filipinas Heritage Library, Manila
  A manual for learning Hokkien written by a Spanish missionary in the Philippines.
  The oldest known rhyme dictionary of a Zhangzhou dialect.
 
 
 當代泉州音字彙, a dictionary of Quanzhou speech
 Voyager – Spacecraft – Golden Record – Greetings From Earth – Amoy, includes translation and sound clip
 (The voyager clip says:  太空朋友，恁好。恁食飽未？有閒著來阮遮坐哦!)

 
Southern Min-language dialects
Languages of China
Languages of Taiwan
Languages of Singapore
Languages of Malaysia
Languages of Indonesia
Languages of the Philippines